The United States competed at the 2014 Winter Paralympics in Sochi, Russia, held between 7–16 March 2014. The team consists of 80 athletes (58 on foot and 22 on wheelchairs), including 6 guides for visually impaired athletes, competing in all five sports.

Alpine skiing 

Men

Women

Snowboarding 
Men

 Women

Biathlon

Visually impaired

Sitting

Standing

Cross-country skiing 

Visually impaired

Sitting

Standing

Ice sledge hockey 

Preliminary round

Semifinal

Gold Medal Game

Wheelchair curling 

The United States qualified a mixed wheelchair curling team as one of the nine highest-ranked nations based on results from the last three World Wheelchair Curling Championships.

Team

Standings

Results

Draw 1
Saturday, March 8, 9:30

Draw 2
Saturday, March 8, 15:30

Draw 3
Sunday, March 9, 9:30

Draw 5
Monday, March 10, 9:30

Draw 6
Monday, March 10, 15:30

Draw 8
Tuesday, March 11, 15:30

Draw 9
Wednesday, March 12, 9:30

Draw 10
Wednesday, March 12, 15:30

Draw 11
Thursday, March 13, 9:30

See also
United States at the Paralympics
United States at the 2014 Winter Olympics

References

Nations at the 2014 Winter Paralympics
2014
Winter Paralympics